The 24th Ryder Cup Matches were held 18–20 September 1981 at the Walton Heath Golf Club in Walton-on-the-Hill, Surrey, England, southwest of London. The United States team won the competition by a score of 18 to 9 points. It was the largest margin of defeat for a European team (since 1979) at the Ryder Cup until 2021. It is also the largest margin of defeat for the host team on European soil.

Seve Ballesteros was not selected for the European team after an ongoing dispute with the European Tour concerning appearance money. Tony Jacklin was also left off the team.

It was the sixth and final Ryder Cup for Jack Nicklaus as a competitor and he won all four of his matches. He had failed to make the team for the first time in 1979. Bernhard Langer made his Ryder Cup debut in 1981 and was 1–2 in pairs and halved his singles match.

Format
The Ryder Cup is a match play event, with each match worth one point.  The competition format was adjusted slightly from the 1979 event, with the order of play swapped on the first two days and the third day singles matches held in a single session:
Day 1 — 4 foursome (alternate shot) matches in a morning session and 4 four-ball (better ball) matches in an afternoon session
Day 2 — 4 four-ball matches in a morning session and 4 foursome matches in an afternoon session
Day 3 — 12 singles matches
With a total of 28 points, 14 points were required to win the Cup.  All matches were played to a maximum of 18 holes.

Teams

Ten of the European team were selected using a points list based on money earned in European Tour Events. The final event was the Benson & Hedges International Open which finished on 24 August. Eamonn Darcy finished in a tie for second place in this tournament, lifting him from 12th to 7th in the list and relegating Mark James to 11th place. The two remaining places were chosen immediately after the Benson & Hedges International by a selection committee consisting of John Jacobs (the captain), Neil Coles and Bernhard Langer. They chose Mark James and Peter Oosterhuis, who was playing on the PGA Tour and had recently won the Canadian Open.

Players chosen by the selection committee are shown in yellow.

11 of the American team were selected from a points list. Qualification based on the points list finished after the Western Open on July 5. Bill Rogers earned his place by finishing 5th in this final event, while Jack Nicklaus only assured his place in the team after a final round 69 and a tie for 7th place. The final place in the team was allocated to the winner of the 1981 PGA Championship (which finished on August 9), provided he was not in the top 11, in which case the 12th player in the points list would qualify (Howard Twitty). With his victory in the PGA Championship, Larry Nelson gained the last slot. Nelson had finished 17th in the points list.

Nelson qualified by virtue of winning the 1981 PGA Championship.

Friday's matches
18 September 1981

Morning foursomes

Afternoon four-ball

Saturday's matches
19 September 1981

Morning four-ball

Afternoon foursomes

Sunday's singles matches
20 September 1981

Individual player records
Each entry refers to the win–loss–half record of the player.

Source:

Europe

United States

Video
2012 Ryder Cup   Ryder Cup Flashback: 1981 
1981 Ryder Cup   British broadcast

References

External links
PGA of America: 1981 Ryder Cup
About.com: 1981 Ryder Cup
Walton Heath Golf Club: 1981 Ryder Cup

Ryder Cup
Golf tournaments in England
Sport in Surrey
Ryder Cup
Ryder Cup
Ryder Cup